Greenbush is an unincorporated community in Brown County, in the U.S. state of Ohio.

History
Greenbush was laid out in 1838. The community was named for a patch of green bushes near the original town site.

References

Unincorporated communities in Brown County, Ohio
1838 establishments in Ohio
Populated places established in 1838
Unincorporated communities in Ohio